Bratteli's First Cabinet governed Norway between 17 March 1971 and 18 October 1972. The Labour Party cabinet was led by Trygve Bratteli. Bratteli governed his second cabinet between 1973 and 1976.

On 8 May 1972 there was a cabinet reshuffle. The Ministry of Wages and Prices was discontinued, the Ministry of Family and Consumer Affairs was restructured as the Ministry of Consumer Affairs and Administration, and the Ministry of the Environment was established.

Cabinet members 

|}

State Secretaries

References 
Trygve Brattelis første regjering 1971-1972 - Regjeringen.no

Notes 

Bratteli 1
Bratteli 1
1971 establishments in Norway
1972 disestablishments in Norway
Cabinets established in 1971
Cabinets disestablished in 1972